In organic chemistry, an acyl chloride (or acid chloride) is an organic compound with the functional group . Their formula is usually written , where R is a side chain.  They are reactive derivatives of carboxylic acids.  A specific example of an acyl chloride is acetyl chloride, . Acyl chlorides are the most important subset of acyl halides.

Nomenclature
Where the acyl chloride moiety takes priority, acyl chlorides are named by taking the name of the parent carboxylic acid, and substituting -yl chloride for -ic acid. Thus:

When other functional groups take priority, acyl chlorides are considered prefixes — chlorocarbonyl-:

Properties
Lacking the ability to form hydrogen bonds, acyl chlorides have lower boiling and melting points than similar carboxylic acids. For example, acetic acid boils at 118 °C, whereas acetyl chloride boils at 51 °C. Like most carbonyl compounds, infrared spectroscopy reveals a band near 1750 cm−1.

The simplest stable acyl chloride is acetyl chloride; formyl chloride is not stable at room temperature, although it can be prepared at –60 °C or below. 

Acyl chlorides hydrolyze (react with water) to form the corresponding carboxylic acid and hydrochloric acid:
RCOCl  + H2O -> RCOOH + HCl

Synthesis

Industrial routes
The industrial route to acetyl chloride involves the reaction of acetic anhydride with hydrogen chloride: 
(CH3CO)2O + HCl -> CH3COCl + CH3CO2H

Propionyl chloride is produced by chlorination of propionic acid with phosgene:
CH3CH2CO2H + COCl2 -> CH3CH2COCl + HCl + CO2

Benzoyl chloride is produced by the partial hydrolysis of benzotrichloride:
C6H5CCl3 + H2O -> C6H5C(O)Cl + 2 HCl

Similarly, benzotrichlorides react with carboxylic acids to the acid chloride. This conversion is practiced for the reaction of 1,4-bis(trichloromethyl)benzene to give terephthaloyl chloride:
C6H4(CCl3)2  +  C6H4(CO2H)2  ->  2 C6H4(COCl)2 +  2 HCl

Laboratory methods: thionyl chloride 
In the laboratory, acyl chlorides are generally prepared by treating carboxylic acids with thionyl chloride. The reaction is catalyzed by dimethylformamide and other additives.

Thionyl chloride⁠ is a well-suited reagent as the by-products (HCl) are gases and residual thionyl chloride can be easily removed as a result of its low boiling point (76 °C). The reaction with thionyl chloride is catalyzed by dimethylformamide.

Laboratory methods: phosphorus chlorides
Phosphorus trichloride is also popular, phosphorus pentachloride. although excess reagent is required.  Phosphorus pentachloride is also effective but only one chloride is transferred:
RCO2H + PCl5  ->  RCOCl + POCl3 + HCl

Laboratory methods: oxalyl chloride
Another method involves the use of oxalyl chloride:
RCO2H + ClCOCOCl ->[DMF]  RCOCl + CO + CO2 + HCl
The reaction is catalysed by dimethylformamide (DMF), which reacts with oxalyl chloride to give the Vilsmeier reagent, an iminium intermediate that which reacts with the carboxylic acid to form a mixed imino-anhydride. This structure undergoes an acyl substitution with the liberated chloride, forming the acid anhydride and releasing regenerated molecule of DMF. Relative to thionyl chloride, oxalyl chloride is more expensive but also a milder reagent and therefore more selective.

Other laboratory methods 
Acid chlorides can be used as a chloride source.  Thus acetyl chloride can be distilled from a mixture of benzoyl chloride and acetic acid:
CH3CO2H + C6H5COCl ->  CH3COCl + C6H5CO2H

Other methods that do not form HCl include the Appel reaction:
RCO2H + Ph3P + CCl4 -> RCOCl + Ph3PO + HCCl3
Another is the use of cyanuric chloride:
RCO2H  + C3N3Cl3  ->  RCOCl  + C3N3Cl2OH

Reactions
Acyl chloride are reactive, versatile reagents. Acyl chlorides have a greater reactivity than other carboxylic acid derivatives like acid anhydrides, esters or amides:

Nucleophilic reactions
Acid chlorides are useful for the preparation of amides, esters, anhydrides.  These reactions generate chloride, which can be undesirable. Acyl chlorides hydrolyze, yielding the carboxylic acid:

This hydrolysis is usually a nuisance rather than intentional. Acyl chlorides are used to prepare acid anhydrides, amides and esters, by reacting acid chlorides with: a salt of a carboxylic acid, an amine, or an alcohol, respectively.

Mechanism
The alcoholysis of acyl halides (the alkoxy-dehalogenation) is believed to proceed via an SN2 mechanism (Scheme 10).⁠ However, the mechanism can also be tetrahedral or SN1 in highly polar solvents⁠ (while the SN2 reaction involves a concerted reaction, the tetrahedral addition-elimination pathway involves a discernible intermediate).

Bases, such as pyridine or N,N-dimethylformamide, catalyze acylations. These reagents activate the acyl chloride via a nucleophilic catalysis mechanism. The amine attacks the carbonyl bond and presumably⁠ first forms a transient tetrahedral intermediate, then forms a quaternary acylammonium salt by the displacement of the leaving group. This quaternary acylammonium salt is more susceptible to attack by alcohols or other nucleophiles.

The use of two phases (aqueous for amine, organic for acyl chloride) is called the Schotten-Baumann reaction. This approach is used in the preparation of nylon via the so-called nylon rope trick.⁠

Conversion to ketones
Carbon nucleophiles such as Grignard reagents, convert acyl chlorides to ketones, which in turn are susceptible to the attack by second equivalent to yield the tertiary alcohol. The reaction of acyl halides with certain organocadmium reagents stops at the ketone stage.  The reaction with Gilman reagents also afford ketones, reflecting  the low nucleophilicity of these lithium diorganocopper compounds.

Reduction
Acyl chlorides are reduced by lithium aluminium hydride and diisobutylaluminium hydride to give primary alcohols. Lithium tri-tert-butoxyaluminium hydride, a bulky hydride donor, reduces acyl chlorides to aldehydes, as does the Rosenmund reduction using hydrogen gas over a poisoned palladium catalyst.

Acylation of arenes
With Lewis acid catalysts like ferric chloride or aluminium chloride, acyl chlorides participate in Friedel-Crafts acylations, to give aryl ketones:

Because of the harsh conditions and the reactivity of the intermediates, this otherwise quite useful reaction tends to be messy, as well as environmentally unfriendly.

Oxidative addition
Acyl chlorides react with low-valent metal centers to give transition metal acyl complexes.  Illustrative is the oxidative addition of acetyl chloride to Vaska's complex, converting square planar Ir(I) to octahedral Ir(III):
IrCl(CO)(PPh3)2  +  CH3COCl  ->  CH3COIrCl2(CO)(PPh3)2

Hazards
Low molecular weight acyl chlorides are often lachrymators, and they react violently with water, alcohols, and amines.

References

 
Functional groups